Terekhovskaya is a rural locality (a village) in Nikolotorzhskoye Rural Settlement, Kirillovsky District, Vologda Oblast, Russia. The population was 35 as of 2002.

Geography 
Terekhovskaya is located 48 km northeast of Kirillov (the district's administrative centre) by road. Tatyanino is the nearest rural locality.

References 

Rural localities in Kirillovsky District